Joubert is a French surname. It is a regional variant form of Jaubert, originating in the centre west and centre south of France. This surname is common to South Africa and Namibia, particularly among the descendants of Huguenot settlers.

It may refer to:

Persons

Military
 Barthelemy Catherine Joubert (1769–1799), French general during the French Revolutionary Wars
 David Joubert, South African general, nephew of Petrus Jacobus "Piet" Joubert
 Léopold Louis Joubert (1842–1927), French soldier and lay missionary in the Belgian Congo
 Piet Joubert (1831–1900), South African commandant-general (equivalent to major general) and vice president of the South African Republic
 Philip Joubert de la Ferté, British air marshal

Music
 John Joubert (composer), British composer
 The Joubert Singers, choir, notable for "Stand on the Word"
 Phyliss McKoy-Joubert, composer, most notably for "Stand on the Word"
 Gwynneth Joubert, South African singer-songwriter, known by her stage name as Gwynneth Ashley-Robin, most notably for Little Jimmy and Little Soldier Blue

Sports
 André Joubert, South African rugby union player
 Brian Joubert (born 1984), French figure skater
 Craig Joubert, South African rugby union referee
 Danie Joubert, South African sprinter
 Ernst Joubert, South African rugby union player
 Marius Joubert, South African rugby union player

Others
 Elsa Joubert (1922–2020), South African writer in Afrikaans
 Gideon Joubert, South African author and journalist
 Jacqueline Joubert, French television presenter
 John Joubert (serial killer) (1963–1996), American serial killer
 Joseph Joubert (1754–1824), French moralist and essayist
 Laurent Joubert (1529-1582), French physician
 Marie Joubert, Canadian neurologist who first identified Joubert syndrome
 Pierre Joubert (illustrator), French illustrator
 Pierre Joubert (viticulturalist), (1664-1732)

Fictional characters
 Joubert, in Sydney Pollack's film Three Days of the Condor (1975), played by Max von Sydow
 Marguerite (Minou) Reydon-Joubert (née Joubert), hero of both Kate Mosse' historical novels in 'The Burning Chambers' series, 'The Burning Chambers' and 'The City of Tears'

References

See also
 General Joubert (disambiguation)

French-language surnames
Afrikaans-language surnames
Surnames of French origin